N. B. Srikanth is an Indian film editor, working primarily in the Tamil film industry. He worked along with Praveen K. L. in various successful films.

Filmography

 2007: Chennai 600028
 2008: Saroja
 2009: Kunguma Poovum Konjum Puravum
 2009: Vedigundu Murugesan
 2009: Kanthaswamy
 2009: Kasko (Telugu)
 2010: Naanayam
 2010: Goa
 2010: Gurushetram - 24 Hours of Anger
 2010: Kaadhal Solla Vandhen
 2010: Nagaram
 2010: Kanimozhi
 2010: Oru Nunna Katha (Malayalam)
 2011: Pickles (Malayalam)
 2011: Aaranya Kaandam (National Film Award for Best Editing)
 2011: Mankatha
 2012: Aravaan
 2012: Kazhugu
 2012: Second Show (Malayalam film)
 2012: Kalakalappu
 2012: Thadaiyara Thaakka
 2012: Murattu Kaalai
 2012: Madha Gaja Raja
 2013: Mathil Mel Poonai
 2013: Alex Pandian
 2013: Vathikuchi
 2013: Endrendrum Punnagai
 2013: Thillu Mullu
 2013: Biriyani
 2013: Theeya Velai Seiyyanum Kumaru
 2014: Koothara (Malayalam)
 2014: Meaghamann
 2014: Aranmanai
 2014  Thirudan Police
 2015: Aambala
 2016: Hello Naan Pei Pesuren
 2016: Aranmanai 2
 2018: Kalakalappu 2
 2019: Vantha Rajavathaan Varuven
 2019: Thadam
 2019: Action
 2021: Anandham Vilayadum Veedu
 2022: Kadamaiyai Sei
 2022: Veerame Vaagai Soodum
 2022: Naan Mirugamaai Maara
 2022: Kalaga Thalaivan
 2022: Varalaru Mukkiyam
 2022: Laththi

Awards
 2008 Ananda Vikatan Cinema Award for Best editor - Saroja
 2011 National Film Award for Best Editing - Aaranya Kaandam

References

Living people
Indian film editors
Tamil film editors
Best Editor National Film Award winners
Year of birth missing (living people)